Dahlerau is a borough of Radevormwald, located in the Oberbergischer Kreis, North Rhine-Westphalia, Germany. It is located in the valley of the river Wupper and situated about 7 km by road away from Radevormwald city centre.
Dahlerau was the site of a severe train disaster in 1971.

Towns in North Rhine-Westphalia